Vocational education is education that prepares people to a skilled craft as an artisan, trade as a tradesperson, or work as a technician. Vocational Education can also be seen as that type of education given to an individual to prepare that individual to be gainfully employed or self employed with requisite skill. Vocational education is known by a variety of names, depending on the country concerned, including career and technical education, or acronyms such as TVET (technical and vocational education and training) and TAFE (technical and further education).

A vocational school is a type of educational institution specifically designed to provide vocational education.

Vocational education can take place at the post-secondary, further education, or higher education level and can interact with the apprenticeship system. At the post-secondary level, vocational education is often provided by highly specialized trade schools, technical schools, community colleges, colleges of further education (UK), vocational universities, and institutes of technology (formerly called polytechnic institutes).

Overview
Historically, almost all vocational education took place in the classroom or on the job site, with students learning trade skills and trade theory from accredited instructors or established professionals. However, in recent years, online vocational education has grown in popularity, making learning various trade skills and soft skills from established professionals easier than ever for students, even those who may live far away from a traditional vocational school.

Trends have emerged in the implementation of TVET and skills development worldwide. From the late 1980s onwards a number of governments began to emphasise on the role of education in preparing learners effectively for the world of work. This school of thought, termed "new vocationalism", placed the skills needs of industry at the centre of discussions on the purpose of public education. TVET and skills development were viewed as an important component in promoting economic growth in general and addressing youth unemployment in particular.

General education systems had not been effective in developing the skills that many adolescents and adults needed to secure employment in industry. The late 1980s and early 1990s saw the introduction and expansion of new vocational curricula and courses, often developed in collaboration with industry, and an increase in the variety of work-based learning routes on offer to young people.

Opinions and models
Wilhelm von Humboldt's educational model goes beyond vocational training. In a letter to the Prussian king, he wrote: "There are undeniably certain kinds of knowledge that must be of a general nature and, more importantly, a certain cultivation of the mind and character that nobody can afford to be without. People obviously cannot be good craftworkers, merchants, soldiers or businessmen unless, regardless of their occupation, they are good, upstanding and – according to their condition – well-informed human beings and citizens. If this basis is laid through schooling, vocational skills are easily acquired later on, and a person is always free to move from one occupation to another, as so often happens in life." The philosopher Julian Nida-Rümelin criticized discrepancies between Humboldt's ideals and the contemporary European education policy, which narrowly understands education as a preparation for the labor market, and argued that we need to decide between "McKinsey", to describe vocational training, and Humboldt.

By country

Argentina
Argentina was one of the first countries in Latin America to run apprenticeship and vocational programs. From 1903 to 1909 basic programs were delivered at main cities. The entity charged with delivering these programs was the General Workers' Union (Spanish: Unión General de Trabajadores; abbreviated UGT), an Argentine national labor confederation.

The massive development of vocational education in Argentina took place during the period between World War I and World War II, with the large influx of immigrants from Europe. During the presidency of Juan Perón, the first formal apprenticeship and vocational training programs were offered free of charge across the country, eventually becoming the National Workers' University (Universidad Obrera Nacional) under the National Vocational Programs Law 13229, implemented on August 19, 1948. These programs were created and supported by the federal government and delivered by provincial governments at various technical colleges and regional universities as well as industrial centers; they were meant to deal with the lack of technical specialists in Argentina at a time of rapid industrialization expansion across the country. The degrees granted were that of technician and factory engineer in many specialties.

Currently, vocational education programs are delivered by public and private learning organizations, supported by the Argentine Ministry of Labour and Ministry of Education. The leading providers of technical and vocational education in the country are the National Technological University (UTN) (Universidad Tecnológica Nacional, UTN) and the National University of the Arts (UNA) (Universidad Nacional de las Artes, UNA).

Australia

In Australia vocational education and training is mostly post-secondary and provided through the vocational education and training (VET) system by registered training organisations. However some secondary schools do offer school-based apprenticeships and traineeships for students in years 10, 11 and 12. There were 24 Technical Colleges in Australia but now only 5 independent Trade Colleges remain with three in Queensland; one in Townsville (Tec-NQ), one in Brisbane (Australian Trade College) and one on the Gold Coast (Australian Industry Trade College) and one in Adelaide and Perth.  This system encompasses both public, TAFE, and private providers in a national training framework consisting of the Australian Quality Training Framework, Australian Qualifications Framework and Industry Training Packages which define the competency standards for the different vocational qualifications.

Australia's apprenticeship system includes both apprenticeships in "traditional" trades and "traineeships" in other more service-oriented occupations. Both involve a legal contract between the employer and the apprentice or trainee and provide a combination of school-based and workplace training. Apprenticeships typically last three to four years, traineeships only one to two years. Apprentices and trainees receive a wage which increases as they progress through the training scheme.

The states and territories are responsible for providing funding for government subsidised delivery in their jurisdiction and the Commonwealth Government, through the Australian Quality Skills Authority, provides regulation of registered training organisations except in Victoria and Western Australia. A central concept of the VET system is "national recognition", whereby the assessments and awards of any one registered training organisation must be recognised by all others, and the decisions of any VET regulatory authority must be recognised by the all states and territories. This allows national portability of qualifications and units of competency.

A crucial feature of the training package (which accounts for about 60% of publicly funded training and almost all apprenticeship training) is that the content of the vocational qualifications is theoretically defined by industry and not by government or training providers. A Training Package is endorsed by the Australian Industry and Skills Committee before it can be used by RTOs to deliver Nationally Accredited Training.

The National Centre for Vocational Education Research or NCVER is a not-for-profit company owned by the federal, state and territory ministries responsible for training. It is responsible for collecting, managing, analysing, evaluating and communicating research and statistics about vocational education and training (VET).

The boundaries between vocational education and tertiary education are becoming more blurred. A number of vocational training providers such as Melbourne Polytechnic, BHI and WAI are now offering specialised bachelor's degrees in specific areas not being adequately provided by universities. Such applied courses include equine studies, winemaking and viticulture, aquaculture, information technology, music, illustration, culinary management and many more.

Commonwealth of Independent States
The largest and the most unified system of vocational education was created in the Soviet Union with the professional`no-tehnicheskoye uchilische and Tehnikum. But it became less effective with the transition of the economies of post-Soviet countries to a market economy.

European Union
Education and training is the responsibility of member states, but the single European labour market makes some cooperation on education imperative, including on vocational education and training. The 'Copenhagen process', based on the open method of cooperation between Member States, was launched in 2002 in order to help make vocational education and training better and more attractive to learners throughout Europe. The process is based on mutually agreed priorities that are reviewed periodically. Much of the activity is monitored by Cedefop, the European Centre for the Development of Vocational Training.

There is strong support, particularly in northern Europe, for a shift of resources from university education to vocational training. This is due to the perception that an oversupply of university graduates in many fields of study has aggravated graduate unemployment and underemployment. At the same time, employers are experiencing a shortage of skilled tradespeople.

Finland
In Finland, vocational education belongs to secondary education. After the nine-year comprehensive school, almost all students choose to go to either a lukio (high school), which is an institution preparing students for tertiary education, or to a vocational school. Both forms of secondary education last three years, and give a formal qualification to enter university or ammattikorkeakoulu, i.e., Finnish polytechnics. In certain fields (e.g., the police school, air traffic control personnel training), the entrance requirements of vocational schools include completion of the lukio, thus causing the students to complete their secondary education twice.

The education in vocational school is free, and students from low-income families are eligible for a state student grant. The curriculum is primarily vocational, and the academic part of the curriculum is adapted to the needs of a given course. The vocational schools are mostly maintained by municipalities.

After completing secondary education, one can enter higher vocational schools (ammattikorkeakoulu, or AMK) or universities.

It is also possible for a student to choose both lukio and vocational schooling. The education in such cases lasts usually from three to four years.

Germany
Vocational education in Germany is based on the German model. A law (the Berufsausbildungsgesetz) was passed in 1969 which regulated and unified the vocational training system and codified the shared responsibility of the state, the unions, associations and Industrie- und Handelskammer (chambers of trade and industry). The system is very popular in modern Germany: in 2001, two-thirds of young people aged under 22 began an apprenticeship, and 78% of them completed it, meaning that approximately 51% of all young people under 22 have completed an apprenticeship. One in three companies offered apprenticeships in 2003; in 2004 the government signed a pledge with industrial unions that all companies except very small ones must take on apprentices.

Greece
In Greece, vocational education and training (VET) is usually for lyceum (senior high school) graduates and is provided by public or private Institute of Vocational Training (IEK)  (IEK, the Greek abbreviation for the Ινστιτούτο Επαγγελματικής Κατάρτισης). The IEK course offerings are adult education only, except at times when it is rarely offered a course for non-adult students. Public IEKs are government-funded with free education, and it can be attended without tuition fee.

Hong Kong
In Hong Kong, vocational education is usually for post-secondary 6 students.  The Hong Kong Institute of Vocational Education (IVE) provides training in nine different vocational fields, namely: applied science, business administration, child education and community services, construction, design, printing, textiles and clothing, hotel service and tourism studies, information technology, electrical and electronic engineering, and mechanical, manufacturing and industrial engineering.

Hungary
Normally at the end of elementary school (at age 14) students are directed to one of three types of upper secondary education: one academic track (gymnasium) and two vocational tracks.  Vocational secondary schools (szakgimnázium) provide four years of general education and also prepare students for the maturata (school leaving certificate). These schools combine general education with some specific subjects, referred to as pre-vocational education and career orientation. At that point many students enrol in a post-secondary VET programme often at the same institution a vocational qualification, although they may also seek entry to tertiary education.

Vocational training schools (szakiskola) initially provide two years of general education, combined with some pre-vocational education and career orientation, they then choose an occupation, and then receive two or three years of vocational education and training focusing on that occupation—such as bricklayer. Students do not obtain the maturata but a vocational qualification at the end of a successfully completed programme. Demand for vocational training, both from the labour market and among students, has declined while it has increased for upper secondary schools delivering the maturata.

India
Vocational training in India historically has been a subject handled by the Ministry of Labour, other central ministries and various state-level organizations. To harmonize the variations and multiplicity in terms of standards and costs, the National Skills Qualification Framework was launched in December 2013.

The National Skills Qualifications Framework (NSQF) is a competency-based framework that organizes all qualifications according to a series of levels of knowledge, skills and aptitude. These levels, graded from one to ten, are defined in terms of learning outcomes which the learner must possess regardless of whether they are obtained through formal, non-formal or informal learning. NSQF in India was notified on 27 December 2013. All other frameworks, including the NVEQF (National Vocational Educational Qualification Framework) released by the Ministry of HRD, stand superseded by the NSQF.

In November 2014 the new Government in India formed the Ministry of Skill Development and Entrepreneurship. Articulating the need for such a Ministry, the Prime Minister said, "A separate Ministry, which will look after promoting entrepreneurship and skill development, would be created. Even developed countries have accorded priority to promoting skilled manpower".

As a continuation of its efforts to harmonize and consolidate skill development activities across the country, the Government launched the 1st Skill India Development Mission (NSDM) on 15 July 2015. Also launched on the day was the National Policy for Skill Development & Entrepreneurship.

Today all skill development efforts through the Government (Directorate General of Training) and through the Public Private Partnership arm (National Skill Development Corporation) are carried out under the Ministry, through the Skill India Mission.

The Ministry works with various central ministries and departments and the State government in implementing the NSQF across all Government funded projects, based on a five-year implementation schedule for complete convergence.

The involvement of the private sector in various aspects of skill development has enhanced access, quality, and innovative financing models leading to sustainable skill development organizations on the ground. The short-term skill development programs (largely offered by private organizations) combined with the long-term programs offered by the Indian technical institutes (ITIs) complement each other under the larger framework. Credit equivalency, transnational standards, quality assurance and standards are being managed by the Ministry through the National Skill Development Agency (an autonomous body under the Ministry) in close partnership with industry-led sector-specific bodies (Sector Skill Councils) and various line ministries.

India has bilateral collaboration with governments including those of the UK, Australia, Germany, Canada, and the UAE, with the intention of implementing globally acceptable standards  and providing the Indian workforce with overseas job mobility.

Israel 
Israel offers a post-high school college education system for technical occupations and engineering, aimed at high-school graduates of technological tracks. Students demonstrating technological potential in schools supervised by the Ministry of Labor, Social Affairs, and Services (MOLSA) may avail themselves of the MENTA Program, which provides scholastic, emotional, and social support throughout their high school and college studies. This support helps students meet the scholastic challenges and demands of the vocational track and, via the program, strives to expand both the number of youth continuing through college Grades 13-14 and the percentage eligible for a diploma at the end of their studies. The program was formulated by JDC-Ashalim in cooperation with the HEZNEK organization, the Ministry of Education, the Ministry of Economy (and subsequently, MOLSA), and by education networks operating schools. A 2016-17 formative evaluation of MENTA found that the program was successful in helping students complete their matriculation, strengthen their sense of self-efficacy, and create for themselves a picture of the future.  At the same time, the findings suggested that program better clarify the target population, improve the supports for transition to college, and more clearly define the scope of the coordinators' role.

Japan
They are part of Japan's higher education system. They are two-year schools that many students study at after finishing high school (although it is not always required that students graduate from high school). Some have a wide range of majors, others only a few majors. Some examples are computer technology, fashion, and English.

South Korea
Vocational high schools offer programmes in five fields: agriculture, technology/engineering, commerce/business, maritime/fishery, and home economics. In principle, all students in the first year of high school (10th grade) follow a common national curriculum, In the second and third years (11th and 12th grades) students are offered courses relevant to their specialisation. In some programmes, students may participate in workplace training through co-operation between schools and local employers. The government is now piloting Vocational Meister Schools in which workplace training is an important part of the programme. Around half of all vocational high schools are private. Private and public schools operate according to similar rules; for example, they charge the same fees for high school education, with an exemption for poorer families.

The number of students in vocational high schools has decreased, from about half of students in 1995 down to about one-quarter today. To make vocational high schools more attractive, in April 2007 the Korean government changed the name of vocational high schools into professional high schools. With the change of the name the government also facilitated the entry of vocational high school graduates to colleges and universities.

Most vocational high school students continue into tertiary education; in 2007 43% transferred to junior colleges and 25% to university. At tertiary level, vocational education and training is provided in junior colleges (two- and three-year programmes) and at polytechnic colleges. Education at junior colleges and in two-year programmes in polytechnic colleges leads to an Industrial associate degree. Polytechnics also provide one-year programmes for craftsmen and master craftsmen and short programmes for employed workers. The requirements for admission to these institutions are in principle the same as those in the rest of tertiary sector (on the basis of the College Scholastic Aptitude Test) but candidates with vocational qualifications are given priority in the admission process. Junior colleges have expanded rapidly in response to demand and in 2006 enrolled around 27% of all tertiary students.

95% of junior college students are in private institutions. Fees charged by private colleges are approximately twice those of public institutions. Polytechnic colleges are state-run institutions under the responsibility of the Ministry of Labour; government funding keeps student fees much lower than those charged by other tertiary institutions. Around 5% of students are enrolled in polytechnic colleges.

Malaysia
Skills training are no longer depicted as second-class education in Malaysia. There are numerous vocational education centres here including vocational schools (high schools to train skilled students), technic schools (high schools to train future engineers) and vocational colleges all of them under the Ministry of Education. Then there are 33 polytechnics and 86 community colleges under the Ministry of Higher Education; 10 MARA Advanced Skills Colleges, 13 MARA Skills Institutes, 286 GIATMARAs under Majlis Amanah Rakyat (MARA) and 15 National Youth Skills Institutes under Ministry of Youth and Sports. The first vocational institute in Malaysia is the Industrial Training Institute of Kuala Lumpur established in 1964 under the Manpower Department. Other institutes under the same department including 8 Advanced Technology Training Centres, one Centre for Instructor and Advanced Skill Training, one Japan-Malaysia Technical Institute and the other 21 ITIs.

Mexico
In Mexico, both federal and state governments are responsible for the administration of vocational education. Federal schools are funded by the federal budget, in addition to their own funding sources. The state governments are responsible for the management of decentralised institutions, such as the State Centres for Scientific and Technological Studies (CECyTE) and Institutes of Training for Work (ICAT). These institutions are funded 50% from the federal budget and 50% from the state budget. The state governments also manage and fund "decentralised institutions of the federation", such as CONALEP schools.

Compulsory education (including primary and lower secondary education) finishes at the age of 15 and about half of those aged 15-to-19 are enrolled full-time or part-time in education. All programmes at upper secondary level require the payment of a tuition fee.

The upper secondary vocational education system in Mexico includes over a dozen subsystems (administrative units within the Upper Secondary Education Undersecretariat of the Ministry of Public Education, responsible for vocational programmes) which differ from each other to varying degrees in content, administration, and target group. The large number of school types and corresponding administrative units within the Ministry of Public Education makes the institutional landscape of vocational education and training complex by international standards.

Vocational education and training provided under the Upper Secondary Education Undersecretariat includes three main types of programme:

 "Training for work" (formación para el trabajo) courses at ISCED 2 level are short training programmes, taking typically three to six months to complete. The curriculum includes 50% theory and 50% practice. After completing the programme, students may enter the labour market. This programme does not provide direct access to tertiary education. Those who complete lower secondary education may choose between two broad options of vocational upper secondary education at ISCED 3 level. Both programmes normally take three years to complete and offer a vocational degree as well as the baccalaureate, which is required for entry into tertiary education.
 The title "technical professional – baccalaureate" (profesional técnico — bachiller) is offered by various subsystems though one subsystem (CONALEP) includes two thirds of the students. The programme involves 35% general subjects and 65% vocational subjects. Students are required to complete 360 hours of practical training.
 The programme awarding the "technological baccalaureate" (bachillerato tecnológico) and the title "professional technician" (técnico professional) is offered by various subsystems. It includes more general and less vocational education: 60% general subjects and 40% vocational subjects.

Netherlands
Nearly all of those leaving lower secondary school enter upper secondary (vocational) education (Middelbaar BeroepsOnderwijs, MBO), and around 50% of them follow one of four vocational programmes; technology, economics, agricultural, personal/social services & health care. These programmes vary from 1 to 4 years (by level; only level 2, 3 and 4 diplomas are considered formal "start qualifications" for successfully entering the labour market). The programmes can be attended in either of two pathways. One either involving a minimum of 20% of school time (apprenticeship pathway; BBL-BeroepsBegeleidende Leerweg) or the other, involving a maximum of 80% schooltime (BOL -BeroepsOpleidende Leerweg). The remaining time in both cases is apprenticeship/work in a company. So in effect, students have a choice out of 32 trajectories, leading to over 600 professional qualifications.
BBL-Apprentices usually receive a wage negotiated in collective agreements. Employers taking on these apprentices receive a subsidy in the form of a tax reduction on the wages of the apprentice. (WVA-Wet vermindering afdracht).
Level 4 graduates of senior secondary VET may go directly to institutes for Higher Profession Education and Training (HBO-Hoger beroepsonderwijs), after which entering university is a possibility. This co-existence of upper secondary (MBO) and higher professional (HBO) education creates opportunities for further education and development, as well as a tension in the labour market because many vocations can be studied at various levels, and employers may prefer higher educated employees.
The social partners participate actively in the development of policy. As of January 1, 2012 they formed a foundation for Co operation Vocational Education and Entrepreneurship (St. SBB – stichting Samenwerking Beroepsonderwijs Bedrijfsleven; www.s-bb.nl).  Its responsibility is to advise the Minister on the development of the national vocational education and training system, based on the full consensus of the constituent members (the representative organisations of schools and of entrepreneurship and their centres of expertise). Special topics are Qualification & Examination, Apprenticeships (BPV-Beroepspraktijkvorming) and (labourmarket) Efficiency of VET.
The Centres of Expertices are linked to the four vocational education programmes provided in senior secondary VET on the content of VET programmes and on trends and future skill needs.
The Local County Vocational Training (MBO Raad www.mboraad.nl) represents the VET schools in this foundation and advise on the quality, operations and provision of VET.

New Zealand
New Zealand is served by 11 Industry Training Organisations (ITO).  The unique element is that ITOs purchase training as well as set standards and aggregate industry opinion about skills in the labour market.  Industry Training, as organised by ITOs, has expanded from apprenticeships to a more true lifelong learning situation with, for example, over 10% of trainees aged 50 or over.  Moreover, much of the training is generic.  This challenges the prevailing idea of vocational education and the standard layperson view that it focuses on apprenticeships.

One source for information in New Zealand is the Industry Training Federation. Another is the Ministry of Education.

Polytechnics, Private Training Establishments, Wananga and others also deliver vocational training, amongst other areas.

Nigeria 
The educational system or structure of Nigeria has been changing over time. In the 1970's, the Nigerian educational system was 6-5-4. This changed as time passed, between 1980 and 2005, it was changed to 6-3-3-4. 2008 saw another educational system review to 9-3-4 system of education. All these reviews are shown in the National Policy on Education. Due to the type of education Nigeria inherited from her colonial masters, education in the 1960's were more book oriented.

Norway
Nearly all those leaving lower secondary school enter upper secondary education, and around half follow one of nine vocational programmes.  These programmes typically involve two years in school followed by two years of apprenticeship in a company. The first year provides general education alongside introductory knowledge of the vocational area.  During the second year, courses become more trade-specific.

Apprentices receive a wage negotiated in collective agreements ranging between 30% and 80% of the wage of a qualified worker; the percentage increase over the apprenticeship period. Employers taking on apprentices receive a subsidy, equivalent to the cost of one year in school.
After the two years vocational school programme some students opt for a third year in the "general" programme as an alternative to an apprenticeship. Both apprenticeship and a third year of practical training in school lead to the same vocational qualifications. Upper secondary VET graduates may go directly to Vocational Technical Colleges, while those who wish to enter university need to take a supplementary year of education.

The social partners participate actively in the development of policy. The National Council for Vocational Education and Training advises the Minister on the development of the national vocational education and training system.  The Advisory Councils for Vocational Education and Training are linked to the nine vocational education programmes provided in upper secondary education and advise on the content of VET programmes and on trends and future skill needs. The National Curriculum groups assist in deciding the contents of the vocational training within the specific occupations. The Local County Vocational Training Committees advise on the quality, provision of VET and career guidance.

Paraguay
In Paraguay, vocational education is known as Bachillerato Técnico and is part of the secondary education system. These schools combine general education with some specific subjects, referred to as pre-vocational education and career orientation. After nine years of Educación Escolar Básica (Primary School), the student can choose to go to either a Bachillerato Técnico (Vocational School) or a Bachillerato Científico (High School). Both forms of secondary education last three years, and are usually located in the same campus called Colegio.

After completing secondary education, one can enter to the universities. It is also possible for a student to choose both Técnico and Científico schooling.

Russia

Spain
In Spain, vocational education is divided into 3 stages as of 2014. They're known as Formación profesional Básica, which can be started in 3º ESO; Formación profesional de Grado Medio, which can be started after 4º ESO or after graduating from Formación profesional Básica; and Formación profesional de Grado Superior, which can be started after 2º Bachillerato, or after graduating from Formación profesional de Grado Medio. University can then be accessed after graduating from Formación profesional de Grado Superior, without the need to pass through Bachillerato.

There are typically two courses imparted until graduation. Each titulation is called a Ciclo, heavily specialized depending on its related professional discipline.

Spanish vocational education also features a Dual education system named Formación Profesional Dual, although not all Vocational Schools may feature it.

Sri Lanka
Vocational training from Agricultural subjects to ICT related subjects are available in Sri Lanka. 
In 2005 the Ministry of Vocational and Technical Training (MVTT) introduced the National Vocational Qualifications (NVQ) framework which was an important milestone for the education, economic and social development of Sri Lanka. The NVQ framework consists of seven levels of instruction.  NVQ levels 1 to 4 are for craftsmen designation and successful candidates are issued with National certificates. NVQ levels 5 and 6 are Diploma level, whereas Level 7 is for degree equivalent qualification.

Training courses are provided by many institutions island wide.  All training providers (public and private) must obtain institutional registration and course accreditation from the Tertiary and Vocational Education Commission (TVEC).In order to obtain registration institutions must satisfy specific criteria: infrastructure, basic services, tools and equipment, quality of instruction and staff, based on curriculum and syllabus, and quality of management and monitoring systems.

Government Ministries and Agencies involved in Vocational Training are The Ministry of Vocational and Technical Training (MVTT), The Tertiary and Vocational Education Commission (TVEC), The National Apprentice and Industrial Training Authority (NAITA), The Department of Technical Education and Training (DTET), University of Vocational Technology(UoVT), The Vocational Training Authority (VTA) and the National Youth Services Council (NYSC).

Sweden
Nearly all of those leaving compulsory schooling immediately enter upper secondary schools, and most complete their upper secondary education in three years. Upper secondary education is divided into 13 vocationally oriented and 4 academic national programmes. Slightly more than half of all students follow vocational programmes. All programmes offer broad general education and basic eligibility to continue studies at the post-secondary level. In addition, there are local programmes specially designed to meet local needs and "individual" programmes.

A 1992 school reform extended vocational upper secondary programmes by one year, aligning them with three years of general upper secondary education, increasing their general education content, and making core subjects compulsory in all programmes.  The core subjects (which occupy around one-third of total teaching time in both vocational and academic programmes) include English, artistic activities, physical education and health, mathematics, natural science, social studies, Swedish or Swedish as a second language, and religious studies.  In addition to the core subjects, students pursue optional courses, subjects which are specific to each programme and a special project.

Vocational programmes include 15 weeks of workplace training (Arbetsplatsförlagt lärande – APL) over the three-year period. Schools are responsible for arranging workplace training and verifying its quality. Most municipalities have advisory bodies: programme councils (programmråd) and vocational councils (yrkesråd) composed of employers' and employees' representatives from the locality. The councils advise schools on matters such as provision of workplace training courses, equipment purchase and training of supervisors in APL.

Switzerland

The Swiss vocational education and training system (VET) is regarded by many international experts as the strongest in Europe. It is the mainstream upper secondary program serving 65-70% of Swiss young people. It results in one of the lowest youth unemployment rates in Europe. Managers and the staff take pride in their young apprentices. Several Swiss CEOs of big multinational companies and government members have started their own careers as VET-apprentices, for example Sergio Ermotti, CEO of UBS. At this level, vocational education and training is mainly provided through the "dual system". Apprentices rotate between workplace, vocational school and industry training centers where they develop complementary practical skills relating to the occupation. They spend the biggest amount of time at the workplace emphasizing the importance of on-the-job training. Rotation can be organised in different ways – either by switching places during the week or by allocating entire weeks to one place and form of learning. The program can also start with most of the time devoted to in-school education and then gradually increase the share of in-company training.

Besides the three- or four-year VET programme with Federal VET Diploma, there is also the option of two-year vocational education and training VET programme with Federal VET Certificate for adolescents with lower learning performance. Switzerland draws a distinction between vocational education and training programmes at upper-secondary level, and professional education and training (PET) programmes, which take place at tertiary B level. In 2007, more than half of the population aged 25–64 had a VET or PET qualification as their highest level of education. In addition, universities of applied sciences (Fachhochschulen) offer vocational education at tertiary A level. Pathways enable people to shift from one part of the education system to another.

Turkey
Students in Turkey may choose vocational high schools after completing the 8-year-long compulsory primary and secondary education. Vocational high school graduates may pursue two year-long polytechnics or may continue with a related tertiary degree.

According to a survey by OECD, 38% of 15-year-old students attend vocational study programmes that are offered by Anatolian vocational, Anatolian technical, and technical high schools.

Municipalities in Turkey also offer vocational training. The metropolitan municipality of Istanbul, the most populous city in Turkey, offers year long free vocational programs in a wide range of topics through ISMEK,  an umbrella organization formed under the municipality.

United Kingdom
The first "Trades School" in the UK was Stanley Technical Trades School (now Harris Academy South Norwood) which was designed, built and set up by William Stanley. The initial idea was thought of in 1901, and the school opened in 1907.

The system of vocational education in the UK initially developed independently of the state, with bodies such as the RSA and City & Guilds setting examinations for technical subjects. The Education Act 1944 made provision for a Tripartite System of grammar schools, secondary technical schools and secondary modern schools, but by 1975 only 0.5% of British senior pupils were in technical schools, compared to two-thirds of the equivalent German age group.

Successive recent British Governments have made attempts to promote and expand vocational education. In the 1970s, the Business And Technology Education Council was founded to confer further and higher education awards, particularly to further education colleges in the United Kingdom. In the 1980s and 1990s, the Conservative Government promoted the Youth Training Scheme, National Vocational Qualifications and General National Vocational Qualifications. However, youth training was marginalised as the proportion of young people staying on in full-time education increased.

In 1994, publicly funded Modern Apprenticeships were introduced to provide "quality training on a work-based (educational) route". Numbers of apprentices have grown in recent years and the Department for Children, Schools and Families has stated its intention to make apprenticeships a "mainstream" part of England's education system.

In the UK some higher engineering-technician positions that require 4–5 years' apprenticeship require academic study to HNC / HND or higher City & Guilds level.  Apprenticeships are increasingly recognised as the gold standard for work-based training. There are four levels of apprenticeship available for those aged 16 and over:
 
 1 - Intermediate-level apprenticeships
Apprentices work towards work-based learning qualifications such as a Level 2 Competence Qualification, Functional Skills and, in most cases, a relevant knowledge-based qualification.
 2 - Advanced-level apprenticeships
Apprentices work towards work-based learning such as a Level 3 Competence Qualification, Functional Skills and, in most cases, a relevant knowledge-based qualification. They can take four years to complete.
 3 - Higher apprenticeships
Apprentices work towards work-based learning qualifications such as a Level 4 and 5 Competence Qualification, Functional Skills and, in some cases, a knowledge-based qualification such as a Foundation Degree. They can take between four and five years to complete, depending on the level at which an apprentice enrolls.
 4 - Degree and professional apprenticeships
They are similar to higher apprenticeships, but differ in that they provide an opportunity to gain a full bachelor's (Level 6) or master's degree (Level 7). The courses are designed in partnership with employers, with part-time study taking place at a university. They can take between four and six years to complete, depending on the level of the course, and the level of entry.

"There is also a perception, deriving from centuries of social stratification and selectivity in the status and provision of different kinds of education in England, that vocational education is inevitably more narrowly utilitarian, less influential and less important than its more academic cousin: advanced ('A') levels. This divide between the sectors of 'vocational' and 'higher' education, in many ways peculiarly English, is also reflected in higher education institutions and occupations (regarding academic credentials and some related provisions). These academic-vocational divisions in the 'English model', together with negative social and political perceptions, have to some extent stymied the debate regarding the significance and relevance of vocational education provision to learning, work and the economy" (Loo and Jameson, 2017, p. 1). The authors suggest that the divisions between further and higher education sectors in England be reconsidered. They (Loo and Jameson, 2017) call for an opening up of new pathways of "occupation-related" provisions that offer greater parity, progression and enhanced social mobility in vocational education across the academic levels of England's educational provision.

Loo (2018) uses the term, technical and vocational education and training (TVET) by UNESCO (2012) as in the section below, to offer a more rational term than "vocational" in England, and to reach out to like-minded users in the global educational community. He offers insights into the study of the pedagogy of teachers of work-related programmes. Especially, he investigates the complex issue of how teachers use their know-how in their delivery of work-related programmes. This complexity surrounds the need for these deliverers to have the disciplinary and wider elements relating to knowledge of the relevant work practices, which involves the learning of the type of know-how and its application in their work practices. The combination of these work know-how (e.g. knowledge, experiences, dispositions and values) are then used to enable them to deliver to the learners. These pedagogic activities rely on different types of knowledge and experiences – pedagogic and work-related.

The theoretical framework uses, initially, a dual professionalism concept to review the literature sources of knowledge concerning the occupational pedagogy of teachers. From a pedagogic delineation of knowledge, teaching knowledge may include knowledge of the relevant disciplines (Becher 1994; Bernstein 1996; Smeby 1996) such as psychology and sociology (e.g. learning theories) for the education field. Teaching knowledge may be explicit or tacit (Shulman 1987; Polanyi 1966; Nonaka and Takeuchi 1995; Verloop et al. 2001; Loughran et al. 2003; Collins 2010), and may include a teacher's wider life experiences (Clandinin 1985) and occupational or work-related practices (Loo 2012).

Knowledge concerning occupational practices (i.e. non-teaching) also requires a base of disciplinary or theoretical know-how that may be explicit and a process of application to specific work contexts and the environment it operates in (Bernstein 1996; Loo 2012). This occupational knowledge base also includes knowledge of procedures, skills (e.g. interpersonal and intrapersonal ones which are usually tacit), techniques, transversal abilities, project management abilities, personal capabilities and occupational capacity/awareness (Eraut 2004; Winch 2014). This knowledge base is a wider spectrum than a pedagogic one.

These two forms of knowledge – pedagogic and occupational – may be applied through the processes of recontextualization (Bernstein 1996; van Oers 1998; Barnett 2006, Evans et al. 2010, Loo 2012, 2014). The knowledge forms can be changed through selecting, relocating and refocusing aspects when used in another setting. In particular, the recontextualization processes regarding content (relating to specifications of a programme), pedagogic (relating to teaching activities), occupational (relating to working activities), and work (relating to the systems and processes that are specific to a workplace or organisation). From the initial teaching and occupational dimensions, the final modified know-how of Occupational Pedagogic Knowledge or Occupational Teachers' Capacities is formed via content recontextualization, pedagogic recontextualization, occupational recontextualization, and integrated applied recontextualization (IAR). There are also relevant concepts that offer insights to the application of teaching and occupational know-how. These include knowledgeable practice (Evans 2016), practice architecture (Kemmis and Green 2013), and Systems 1 and 2 (Kahneman 2012). For a detailed description of the theoretical framework, please refer to Chapter 4 in Teachers and Teaching in Vocational and Professional Education (Loo, 2018). The conceptual framework of the occupational pedagogy of teachers is illustrated on page 50 (Loo 2018).

The analysed empirical data is discussed in the separate sections of TVET, higher and professional education courses, five case studies of fashion and textiles, airline industry, dental hygiene, clinical training in emergency medicine and doctors, and a comparison chapter. These chapters offer critical understandings of how pedagogic and occupational know-how are acquired and applied in highly contextualized pedagogic and occupational contexts culminating in the use of teaching strategies/approaches in teaching sessions.

The observations from this investigation include (Loo 2018):
1. there are programme pathways to occupational work
2. occupational pathways are more direct for work-related provisions at higher academic levels than those at the TVET level
3. two strands of practices exist at the outset: teaching and occupational where "basic" disciplinary or theoretical knowledge is used to provide occupational relevance to pedagogic and work-related areas
4. IAR process provides a critical understanding of how the modified teaching, occupational and work capacities are combined to inform the application of appropriate teaching strategies to specific pedagogic settings
5. users acquire the occupational capacities over the course duration, and they include abilities, capabilities, dispositions, experiences, judgement, knowledge, protocols, skill sets and techniques
6. deliverers require the relevant occupational experiences to teach on work-related programmes, and continuous professional development is needed for deliverers to maintain their ongoing professionalism in the two practice strands of teaching and work

Finally, this investigation has implications for teachers, managers and policymakers of occupational courses. For teachers, these include insights of the sources and types of knowledge that are acquired, recontextualized and applied for teaching and working in the related occupational areas. Managers need to empathise with the deliverers and support their professional needs, and policymakers need to acknowledge the complexities of teaching in occupational programmes and that the curriculum, professional staff and institution are adequately supported (Loo 2018).

United States

See also

Policy development for skills and TVET

School-to-work transition
 (Australia)

 (UK)
Vocational IT (India)
Commonwealth Register of Institutions and Courses for Overseas Students (Australia)

References

Sources

Further reading
Achilles, C. M.; Lintz, M.N.; and Wayson, W.W. "Observations on Building Public Confidence in Education." EDUCATIONAL EVALUATION AND POLICY ANALYSIS 11 no. 3 (1989): 275–284.
Banach, Banach, and Cassidy. THE ABC COMPLETE BOOK OF SCHOOL MARKETING. Ray Township, MI: Author, 1996.
Brodhead, C. W. "Image 2000: A Vision for Vocational Education." VOCATIONAL EDUCATION JOURNAL 66, no. 1 (January 1991): 22–25.
Buzzell, C.H. "Let Our Image Reflect Our Pride." VOCATIONAL EDUCATION JOURNAL 62, no. 8 (November–December 1987): 10.
Kincheloe, Joe L. Toil and Trouble: Good Work, Smart Workers, and the Integration of Academic and Vocational Education. New York: Peter Lang Publishing. (1995)
Kincheloe, Joe L. How Do We Tell the Workers?   The Socio-Economic Foundations of Work and Vocational Education. Boulder, CO: Westview Press. (1999)
Lauglo, Jon; Maclean, Rupert (Eds.) "Vocationalisation of Secondary Education Revisited". Series: Technical and Vocational Education and Training: Issues, Concerns and Prospects , Vol. 1. Springer. (2005)
O'Connor, P.J., and Trussell, S.T. "The Marketing of Vocational Education." VOCATIONAL EDUCATION JOURNAL 62, no. 8 (November–December 1987): 31–32.
Ries, E. "To 'V' or Not to 'V': for Many the Word 'Vocational' Doesn't Work." TECHNIQUES 72, no. 8 (November–December 1997): 32–36.
Ries, A., and Trout, J. THE 22 IMMUTABLE LAWS OF MARKETING. New York: HarperCollins Publishers, 1993.
Sharpe, D. "Image Control: Teachers and Staff Have the Power to Shape Positive Thinking." VOCATIONAL EDUCATION JOURNAL 68, no. 1 (January 1993): 26–27.
Shields, C.J. "How to Market Vocational Education." CURRICULUM REVIEW (November 1989): 3-5
Silberman, H.F. "Improving the Status of High School Vocational Education." EDUCATIONAL HORIZONS 65, no. 1 (Fall 1986): 5–9.
Tuttle, F.T. "Let's Get Serious about Image-Building." VOCATIONAL EDUCATION JOURNAL 62, no. 8 (November–December 1987): 11.
"What Do People Think of Us?" TECHNIQUES 72, no. 6 (September 1997): 14–15.
Asian Academy of Film and Television
Reeves, Diane Lindsey CAREER ACADEMY TOOLKIT.  Raleigh, North Carolina: Bright Futures Press, 2006.

External links

Profiles of national vocational education systems compiled from a variety of national and international sources - UNESCO-UNEVOC International Centre for Technical and Vocational Education and Training 
Choosing a Career or Vocational School - U.S. Federal Trade Commission

 
Educational stages
Tertiary education